The Batumi Stadium (batumis st’adioni) officially Adjarabet Arena  (Georgian: აჭარაბეთ არენა), is a football stadium in Batumi, Georgia, which was completed in July 2020. The main tenant of the stadium is FC Dinamo Batumi, who moved from their home at the Dinamo Batumi Angisa football base when it was completed. The capacity of the Stadium is 20,000.

History 
Construction began in January 2018 and was completed in July 2020. Its inauguration, postponed due to the COVID-19 pandemic, took place on 27 October 2020 with an official ceremony in the presence of Prime Minister Giorgi Gakharia.

It has a capacity of 20,000 seats and hosts FC Dinamo Batumi's home matches. It belongs to UEFA category 4 and from 2021 will occasionally host matches of the Georgian national football team.

The stadium was designed by the Turkish firm Bahadır Kul Architecture and cost about 100 million Georgian Laris (25 million euros).

The exterior of the stadium, consisting of a series of panels arranged in the form of overlapping scales that can be illuminated at night, is inspired by the swirling effect of traditional Georgian dances, in particular Khorumi.

The first match was held in November 21, 2020, between Dinamo Batumi and Dila Gori.

On 10th July 2022, Georgian Rugby Team defeated Italy 28-19. Batumi Stadium hosted this historical match, when Georgia defeated first tier team for the first time in 2022 summer series.
In 2023 it will be one of four Georgian venues to host the 2023 UEFA European Under-21 Championship and will host the final.

References

See also
 FC Dinamo Batumi
 Stadiums in Georgia
 List of European stadiums by capacity

Sports venues in Georgia (country)
Football venues in Georgia (country)
Sports venues completed in 2020
Sport in Batumi
Buildings and structures in Batumi